The Baju Empurau (also known in English language as "war jacket") is an armour from Indonesia.

Description
The Baju Empurau is a kind of armor that is made of materials found in nature. It consists of fish scales and tree bark. The larger fish scales are attached to the lower vest with split rattan fibers, the smaller ones with a fixed string made from plant fibers. The lower vest consists of interwoven layers of tree bark. The vest has no sleeves, no collar and is provided with a semicircular shape in the neck area, which serves to protect the neck from blows. It is used by the Sea Dayak ethnic group.

See also 

Baju lamina
Baju rantai
Baru Öröba
Baru lema'a
Karambalangan
Kawaca
Siping-siping

References

External links

 Baju Empurau bei Forensic Fashion
 Baju Empurau im Pitt Rivers Museum

Indonesian inventions
Asian armour
Body armor
Military equipment of antiquity
Military equipment of Indonesia